ebrary (the "e" is lower case) was an online digital library which held over 100,000 scholarly e-books in 2014.  It was available in many academic libraries and provided a set of online database collections that combined scholarly books from over 435 academic, trade, and professional publishers. It also included sheet music (9,000 titles) and government documents. Additionally, ebrary offered a service called "DASH!" for customers to distribute their own PDF content online.

ebrary had 2,700 subscribers (mostly libraries) at the end of 2009. Users gained access through a subscribing library and could view, search, copy, and print documents from their computers.

ebrary was founded in 1999 by friends Christopher Warnock and Kevin Sayar. It was headquartered in Palo Alto, California, and was acquired by ProQuest in 2011. In 2015, ProQuest replaced ebrary with ProQuest Ebook Central. Before it was replaced, it held over 900,000 documents.

Reception 
Staffordshire University in England has supplied some texts for ebrary and encourages use by students and faculty.  The University has been pleased with its effectiveness.  A study of usage there reports, "The ability for students and researchers to search across the full content of 30,000 e‐books in one 'go' and then capture that information quickly and easily is also very valuable." At Hacettepe University, a large school in Turkey, usage has proven valuable because of the limited library collection.

More generally Anne Morris and Panos Balatsoukas report that other universities also have studied usage and consider ebrary a valuable resource.

References

Journal articles 

 Fialkoff, Francine. "The Book Is Not Dead," Library Journal, (June 15, 2009) Vol. 134 Issue 11
 Godwin-Jones, Robert. "E-Books and the Tablet PC," Language, Learning & Technology Vol. 7, 2003 
 Mullarkey, Marty. "Ebrary and two international e-Book surveys." The Acquisitions Librarian 19.3-4 (2008): 213-230.
 Qiuping, Zhang, and Yuan Hao. "Integration of Ebrary Electronic Books to OPAC System." Library Journal 1 (2008): 007.
 Raisinghani, Mahesh S. "Wireless Library Aids Student Productivity," T H E Journal Vol. 30, 2002

External links 
 Archived version of the ebrary website
 "The State of Worldwide Library eBook Lending" by Michael Kozlowski

Commercial digital libraries
ProQuest
American digital libraries